CSC is a company founded on January 1, 1899, that operates in a range of sectors. It is headquartered in Wilmington, Delaware, CSC has offices in the U.S., Canada, Europe, and the Asia-Pacific region.

History
Corporation Service Company (CSC) was founded in 1899 by Otho Nowland, then president of Equitable Guarantee & Trust Company, and Christopher L. Ward. With an initial investment by Nowland, Ward, and another friend, Willard Jackson, The Delaware Incorporators’ Trust Company was created. A similar company was formed separately by Josiah P. Marvel, an attorney and then-leader of the American Bar Association, The Delaware Bar Association, and the Delaware State Chamber of Commerce.

In 1920, Ward and Marvel combined their two companies under the name Corporation Service Company. Throughout the 1970s, CSC continued to serve only Delaware business entities. WMB Holdings is the parent company of CSC.

CSC's Corporate Domains business provides services to Apple, Inc. and Twitter, Starbucks, Lego, Sony Group Corporation, The Walt Disney Company, Ford Motor Company, Bayerische Motoren Werke AG, Toyota Motor Corporation, Vodafone Group Plc, among others.

CSC received a cash infusion from the sale of its subsidiary company, the Delaware Charter Guarantee & Trust Company, which it had acquired in 1977. During the September 11 attacks, the company had offices on the 87th floor of the World Trade Center's South Tower. All 60 employees present at the time of the attacks managed to evacuate the tower before the second plane struck. In 2017, CSC opened its new headquarters in Wilmington, Delaware and rebranded from "Corporation Service Company" to "CSC."

Leadership 
Bruce R. Winn began serving as CSC’s president in 1997 and its chief executive officer in 1998. In 2010, CSC announced the election of Rodman Ward III as its president and chief executive officer. Ward previously served as a board member for 15 years and is a fourth-generation descendant of one of the company’s founders, Christopher Ward.

Acquisition 
In 1990, CSC acquired Florida-based Corporate Information Services. Between 1989 and 1998, CSC expanded through the acquisitions of nine other service providers, including Prentice Hall Legal & Financial Services in 1995, and Entity Service Group, LLC in 1998.

In 2003, CSC acquired Lexis-Nexis Document Solutions to supplement its Uniform Commercial Code (UCC), secured lending, and motor vehicle services. In 2011, CSC acquired MLM Information Services, the industry's foremost corporate tax management services provider. In 2012, CSC purchased Ingeo Systems, Inc., a provider of electronic real estate document recording (eRecording) services.

In 2013, CSC acquired the corporate domain name and online brand services division of Melbourne IT. The unit operates under a new name, CSC Digital Brand Services, and offers domain name management, trademark searching, phishing protection, secure sockets layer certificates, domain name system services, and new gTLD solutions.

In 2014, CSC announced that it had acquired IP Mirror, a Singapore-based provider of corporate domain name registration and online brand protection services. The acquisition of IP Mirror grew CSC Digital Brand Services’ ability to provide service in the Asia-Pacific region.

CSC acquired several companies in 2015, including Koehler Group. Koehler Group is a Hong Kong-headquartered provider of incorporation, tax, accounting, and trade support services. Koehler Group’s offerings add to CSC’s services and provide CSC with additional business process outsourcing capabilities. CSC currently has offices located throughout North America, Europe, and the Asia-Pacific region.

CSC also made acquisitions in 2016, including NetNames. NetNamesNN,  is a European provider of domain name management and online corporate brand protection and specializes in domain name management, Internet monitoring, digital certificate management, and new gTLD management.

In March 2022, CSC offered to buy Dutch-based rival Intertrust Group for $2 billion. The acquisition completed in November that year.

References

* How Delaware Became No. 1
 CSC Expands 1989 to 1998
 CSC 9/11 Attacks CSC Employees Unscathed
 CSC 2003 CSC Acquires LexisNexis
 CSC acquires Ingeo
 CSC acquires DBS Melbourne IT
 CSC acquires IP Mirror
 CSC acquires Koehler Group 2015
 CSC acquires NetNames 2016
 CSC acquires NetNames 2016
 CSC Opens New Headquarters
 Corporation Service Company Announces Major Rebrand

External links

Corporation Service Company (CSC) Official Website

Privately held companies based in Delaware
Business services companies of the United States
Business services companies established in 1899
Companies based in Wilmington, Delaware
1899 establishments in Delaware